The Apostolic Prefecture of Falkland Islands is a Latin Church missionary ecclesiastical jurisdiction or apostolic prefecture of the Catholic Church covering the Falkland Islands and South Georgia and the South Sandwich Islands, UK Southern Atlantic Ocean overseas possessions. 
 
It is immediately exempt to the Holy See and not part of an ecclesiastical province. Its only church in the Falklands is its cathedra, St Mary's, in the Falklands capital Stanley. (Christ Church Cathedral is not a Catholic church but is the southernmost Anglican cathedral in the world, consecrated in 1892.)

History 
The Latin missionary jurisdiction was established on 1 October 1952 as Apostolic Prefecture, splitting the offshore territory of Falkland Islands, South Georgia and the South Sandwich Islands from the Diocese of Punta Arenas in Chile.

Mission Sui Iuris of Saint Helena, Ascension Island and Tristan da Cunha
The Apostolic Prefecture of the Falkland Islands has a close relationship with the Mission Sui Iuris of Saint Helena, Ascension Island and Tristan da Cunha. An exempt mission sui juris, it was created on 18 August 1986 for the British overseas territory of Saint Helena, Ascension and Tristan da Cunha, comprising the Atlantic Ocean islands of Saint Helena, Ascension Island and Tristan da Cunha, splitting these territories from the Archdiocese of Cape Town.

It comprises a church or chapel on each island:
 Church of the Sacred Heart in Jamestown, Saint Helena
 Grotto of Our Lady on Ascension
 Church of Saint Joseph on Tristan da Cunha.

From the start, the office of its ecclesiastical superior has been vested in the Apostolic Prefect of the Falklands, another UK Southern Atlantic overseas possession.

Incumbent ordinaries 
''So far, all incumbents have been members of Roman rite missionary congregations, none titular bishops
 Prelates of the Falkland Islands 
 Friar James Ireland, M.H.M. (March 28, 1952 – †1973)
 Friar Daniel Martin Spraggon, M.H.M. (May 7, 1973 – †September 27, 1985)

 Prelates of the Falkland Islands and Ecclesiastical Superiors of Saint Helena, Ascension Island and Tristan da Cunha
 Mgr. Anton Agreiter, M.H.M. (October 1, 1986 – August 9, 2002; †2003)
 Mgr. Michael Bernard McPartland, S.M.A. (August 9, 2002 – 26 October 2016; †2017)
 Abbot Hugh Allan, O.Praem.  (26 October 2016 – present)

Sources, References and External links 
 GigaCatholic Falkland Islands, with incumbent biography links
 GigaCatholic Saint Helena, Ascension Island and Tristan da Cunha, with incumbent biographies
 Prefecture Website

References

Apostolic prefectures
Christian organizations established in 1952
Roman Catholic dioceses and prelatures established in the 20th century
Catholic Church in the Falkland Islands
1952 establishments in the Falkland Islands